The Democratic Party (PD) was a social democratic and, later on, liberal conservative political party in Romania. In January 2008, it merged with the Liberal Democratic Party (PLD), a splinter group of the National Liberal Party (PNL), to form the Democratic Liberal Party (PDL).

From 1996 to 2005, the party was a member of the Socialist International (SI). From 2004 to 2007, the PD was the junior member of the governing Justice and Truth Alliance (DA), although according to many Romanian opinion polls of the time, it remained the most popular of the two parties. Although it had to formally suspend his leadership to the party when elected president in 2004, the PD was largely associated with former Romanian president Traian Băsescu.

History 

In early 1992, conflict broke out between FSN leaders Ion Iliescu and Petre Roman and this led to the separation of the Iliescu wing under the name of the Democratic National Salvation Front (FDSN), which later became the Party of Social Democracy in Romania (PDSR) and then eventually the Social Democratic Party (PSD).

FSN was defeated by the FDSN in the 1992 general election and consequently spent the next four years in opposition. In 1993, the FSN changed its name to the Democratic Party (PD). In the 1996 general election, the PD jointly ran with the now-defunct Romanian Social Democratic Party (PSDR), under the Social Democratic Union (USD) banner. After having ranked third, they joined a governing coalition with the Romanian Democratic Convention (CDR) and the ethnic Hungarian party Democratic Alliance of Hungarians in Romania (UDMR/RMDSZ). From 2000 to 2004, PD has been again in opposition. It also began to move from social democracy to conservatism and Christian democracy.

In advance of the 2004 elections, the PD joined forces with the National Liberal Party (PNL) to create the Justice and Truth Alliance (DA), whose main purpose was to fight the all-dominating PSD. The DA managed to win around 32% of the votes in both Chambers, not enough for a majority and about 6% less than the PSD. Together with its liberal allies, the UDMR/RMDSZ, and the Conservative Party (PC), the PD was part of the governing coalition until April 2007.

During a congress in 2005, PD members voted in favor of joining the European People's Party (EPP) and abandoning the Party of European Socialists (PES) and the Socialist International (SI). In the same year, Petre Roman left the party and, together  with his followers, formed the Democratic Force (FD).

From mid-2005, the PD's relations with the PNL became strained due to an ongoing open conflict between former President Băsescu and then Prime Minister Călin Popescu-Tăriceanu, who was also the chairman of the PNL. Previously, after his presidential victory in 2004, Băsescu appointed Popescu-Tăriceanu as Prime Minister. Although he wanted to, he could not constitutionally dismiss him; at least, it took him a while to do so. On 1 April 2007, Tăriceanu dismissed the ministers of the PD and formed a minority government.

On 15 December 2007, the PD merged with the Liberal Democratic Party (PLD) to form the Democratic Liberal Party (PDL).

Ideology and policies
The political doctrine of the Democratic Party (PD) shifted from social democracy to liberal conservatism in 2005. The party supported the consolidation of the free market and is supportive of Romania's flat tax rate of 16%. The party also supported reforming the Romanian Constitution in order to bring about decentralization in administration and give greater power to the eight development regions.

In terms of European politics, the Democratic Party (PD):

 Supported EU enlargement to the Western Balkans;
 Supported EU membership for Turkey, as long as it satisfied membership criteria;
 Supported the accession of the Republic of Moldova to the EU;
 Supported the Treaty of Lisbon;
 Believed that the European Parliament should have greater power;
 Opposed a reform of the Common Agricultural Policy;
 Supported a common EU migration policy;
 Supported a common EU defence and security policy;
 Supported a partnership between the US and the EU, where the EU is an "equal and critical" partner.

Leadership of the PD 

1 Roman also served as Senate President between 27 November 1996 and 22 December 1999.

Notable former members 
 Petre Roman – subsequently left and founded the Democratic Force (FD) party;
 Traian Băsescu – elected President of Romania, membership suspended during the first mandate;
 Emil Boc – Mayor of Cluj-Napoca 2004–2008; 2012–present, former Prime Minister between 2008 and 2012;
 Adriean Videanu – Vice-president of PDL, former mayor of Bucharest between 2005 and 2008;
 Radu Berceanu – Senator, former Minister of Transportation, Constructions, and Tourism;
 Cristian Rădulescu, MP, PD Leader in the Chamber of Deputies;
 Gheorghe Albu, MP;
 Roberta Anastase, MP;
 Petru Filip, MEP, former mayor of the municipality of Oradea;
 Ioan Olteanu, MP;
 Cezar Preda, MP;
 Păunel Tise;
 Alexandru Sassu (subsequently switched to PSD);
 Bogdan Niculescu Duvăz (left for PSD together with Sassu);
 Daniel Buda;
 Victor Babiuc, formerly in charge of the Ministry of Defence (currently a member of the National Liberal Party – PNL);
 Radu Vasile, former Prime Minister of Romania (came from the Christian Democratic National Peasants' Party – PNŢCD);
 Anca Boagiu, former minister of European Integration and of Transport;
 Vasile Blaga, former Minister of Administration and Interior, former President of the Senate of Romania;
 Cristian Ilie, MP;
 Nati Meir, a member from June 2007.

In 2007, out of 54 members of the PD group in Chamber of Deputies, 14 were not elected on PD electoral list:

 7 came from Greater Romania Party ;
 4 came from Social Democratic Party ;
 3 came from Conservative Party .

Electoral history

Legislative elections 

Notes:

1 USD members: PD and PSDR (1 senator and 10 deputies).

2 Justice and Truth Alliance members: PNL (28 senators and 64 deputies) and PD.

Presidential elections 

Notes:

1 

2

European elections

References

Bibliography
 Ioan, Scurtu ş.a., "Enciclopedia partidelor politice din România 1859–2003", Editura Meronia, București, 2003.
 Florin-Vasile, Şomlea, "Partidele populare din ţările Uniunii Europene", Editura Cartimpex, Cluj-Napoca, 2007.

Conservative parties in Romania
Social democratic parties in Romania
Former member parties of the Socialist International
Political parties established in 1990
Political parties disestablished in 2008